Governor Hastings may refer to:

Hans Francis Hastings, 12th Earl of Huntingdon (1779–1828), Governor of Dominica from 1822 to 1824
Warren Hastings (1732–1818), de facto Governor-General of India from 1774 to 1785